Abraham Mensah (born 3 April 2003) is a Ghanaian boxer. He represented Ghana at the 2022 Commonwealth Games.

On 4 August 2022, Commey defeated Rukmal Prasanna of Sri Lanka to progress to the semifinals and automatically guarantees Ghana its third bronze medal at the 2022 Commonwealth Games if he loses the semi-final bout.

References

External links 

 

2003 births
Living people
Ghanaian male boxers
Bantamweight boxers
Boxers at the 2022 Commonwealth Games
21st-century Ghanaian people
Commonwealth Games silver medallists for Ghana
Commonwealth Games medallists in boxing
Medallists at the 2022 Commonwealth Games